Baby Dayliner (AKA Ethan Marunas) is a musical recording and performing artist from and based out of New York City. He was born and raised in New York City, and went to Fiorello H. LaGuardia High School of Music & Art and Performing Arts, also known as the high school from the 1980 film Fame. He attended St. John's College in Annapolis, MD and Santa Fe, NM. After varying roles in different bands, Marunas decided to take the stage as a solo act. He became deft at synths, samplers, and recording, and began crafting songs that would be performed under the Baby Dayliner name.

Marunas' first big musical influence was classical as a child violinist. Later came jazz and hip-hop records. His first pop music love was Hall and Oates, which he listened to alongside Kabuki theater music and other sounds.

Baby Dayliner has released two albums on Brassland Records. He was signed to the label as The National's favorite live performer in New York City. Marunas has opened for a variety of musical acts including Scissor Sisters, The National, and Trans Am.

According to Uncut magazine, Baby Dayliner is "a retro romo romp through a New York ghost world that is neither the drainpipe-and-denim sweat pile of CBGBs nor the mirrorball glitz of Studio 54 but somewhere in between."

Discography
High Heart and Low Estate -- first released August 2002, re-released March 2004 on Brassland. Mastered by Joel Hamilton.

1. Raid!
2. Hoodlums In The Hit Parade
3. Party Scenes
4. Madeline
5. Beat Downs
6. High Heart & Low Estate
7. Can't Believe
8. Lullabies
9. Dead Ladies
10. I'll Be Your Counterpart
11. Funeral Dirge

Critics Pass Away -- released May 2006 on Brassland
1. At Least
2. Critics Pass Away
3. House And Confusion
4. The Way You Look Tonight
5. Through These Hills
6. Whodunit?
7. Go On Baby
8. Breezy
9. Small Town Halls
10. Silent Places
11. Simon Sez
12. Nature's Clause
13. Drop Dead Gorgeous

Sources
http://brassland.org
https://web.archive.org/web/20070927004217/http://www.insound.com/label/labels.php?id=brasslan&x=13&y=13

External links
Baby Dayliner official site
Baby Dayliner on Brassland Records
Baby Dayliner on MySpace
Baby Dayliner Guest List on Discollective

American male singers
American rock singers
Living people
Singers from New York (state)
Year of birth missing (living people)